Cobb is an unincorporated community in Kaufman County, located in the U.S. state of Texas. It is located within the Dallas/Fort Worth Metroplex.

History
Originally, the place was known as Cobb's. The area started as a stop on the Texas and Pacific Railway in the mid-1880s and was named for county commissioner and chief justice Carey Cobb. A post office was established at Cobb in 1897 and remained in operation until 1923. There were two general stores in 1914. It had several businesses and farms shown on county maps in the 1930s. It continued to be listed as a community by name but had no population estimates.

Geography

Education
Cobb had its own school in the 1930s. Today, the community is served by the Wills Point Independent School District.

References

Unincorporated communities in Kaufman County, Texas
Unincorporated communities in Texas